Dora Bloch née Feinberg, a dual Israeli-British citizen, was a hostage on Air France Flight 139 from Tel Aviv to Paris. The flight was hijacked on 27 June 1976 after a stopover in Athens and rerouted to Entebbe, Uganda. Bloch became ill on the plane and was taken to a hospital in Kampala, the capital of Uganda. She was not rescued with the other hostages during Operation Entebbe, and went missing from the hospital. Her disappearance led to Britain cutting diplomatic ties with Uganda. Her body was discovered in 1979 in a sugar plantation near the capital. In February 2007, declassified British documents confirmed that she was murdered on the order of Ugandan president Idi Amin.

Biography
Dora Feinberg was born in Jaffa, then a part of the Ottoman Empire and later part of Israel. Her father, was among the founders of the village of Rishon LeZion along with his brother, Dora's uncle, Israel Feinberg. After her father's death, she was raised by an uncle in Egypt. She moved to Jerusalem as an adult. She spoke Hebrew, Arabic, Russian, German, Italian, and English. In 1920, she met Aharon Bloch whilst he was serving in the British Army in the mandate of Palestine. The two married in 1925. As Aharon Bloch was a naturalised citizen of the United Kingdom, this gave Dora British citizenship. They had three sons. In 1976 she was a grandmother and a widow living in Tel Aviv.

Disappearance

On 27 June 1976, Bloch, aged 74 or 75, was on Air France Flight 139, an Airbus A300 plane, travelling to New York City for her youngest son Daniel's wedding. The flight was hijacked by terrorists after a stopover in Athens and was redirected to Entebbe, Uganda. With her fluency in languages, Bloch served as an interpreter between the hostages and hijackers.

Bloch became ill on the plane and was transferred to Mulago Hospital in Kampala. She is believed to have choked on food, and Foreign and Commonwealth Office papers say that she was also being treated for leg ulcers while at the hospital. Bloch's son Ilan Hartuv, who was freed during the subsequent Operation Entebbe counter-terrorist hostage-rescue mission, was able to speak to a Ugandan doctor about his mother's health. Henry Kyemba, then Uganda's Minister of Health, said that he had allowed Bloch to stay in hospital for an extra night before being returned to the other hostages. As a result of this, Bloch was not with the other hostages, and so was not freed during the Operation Entebbe raid.

During Operation Entebbe, Bloch's family in Israel were taken to the HaKirya military complex in Tel Aviv, before going to the airport. Once at the airport, they were told that Bloch was still in Uganda. They spent an hour observing the traditional mourning ritual (shiva), but no longer as she was not confirmed dead.

On 4 July, the British Government were informed that Bloch was not among the hostages released during Operation Entebbe. As a result, she was visited by James Hennessy, then-High Commissioner of the United Kingdom to Uganda, and Peter Chandley, second secretary of the British High Commission in Kampala. Bloch told Chandley that she had been treated well in the hospital, but did not like the food. They were also told that Bloch was going to be moved to the Grand Imperial Hotel in Kampala. Chandley and his wife went to get some food for Bloch, but when they returned, they were denied entry to the hospital. The reason for this was that four men including Farouk Minawa, head of the State Research Bureau (Ugandan secret police) and Idi Amin's Chief of Protocol Nasur Ondoga had taken Bloch from her hospital bed and murdered her. The policeman guarding Bloch was also killed.

Aftermath

A search by Ugandan police did not find Bloch, and the Ugandan government informed the UK that they "had no responsibility" for Bloch after Operation Entebbe. On 9 July, the United Nations debated the Entebbe hijacking incident. The United Kingdom suggested a resolution that condemned both the hijack and the loss of life, so as not to endanger the lives of Britons in Uganda, including Bloch. During the debate, the Ugandan government reiterated their claim that Bloch had been returned to Entebbe airport.

On 13 July, Minister of State for the Foreign and Commonwealth Office Ted Rowlands said that Bloch was presumed dead. On 15 July, the British Government demanded a full search for "Bloch or her body", a request that was never fulfilled. A suggested motive for her killing was retaliation for the deaths of 50 Ugandan soldiers during Operation Entebbe. Amin later expelled Chandley from the High Commission, alleging that he was pro-Israeli and had supported the death of Ugandan troops.

As a result of Bloch's disappearance, Britain withdrew their High Commissioner to Uganda, and on 28 July, Britain cut all diplomatic ties with Uganda. It was the first time in 30 years that Britain had severed ties with a Commonwealth country. The British Government said that the main reason for cutting ties was the disappearance of Bloch, although other events during Amin's leadership had also contributed. In retaliation, Amin declared himself the "Conqueror of the British Empire (CBE)", and the unofficial King of Scotland. He added "Conqueror of the British Empire" to his list of official titles. After the fall of Amin in 1979, Britain recommenced diplomatic relations with Uganda.

In 1987, Kyemba said that Bloch had been dragged from her hospital bed and murdered by members of the Ugandan Army loyal to Amin. Declassified British documents released in February 2007 confirmed that Bloch had been killed on Amin's orders. According to the documents, a Ugandan citizen told the British High Commissioner in Kampala that Bloch had been shot and her body deposited into the boot of a car with Ugandan intelligence services number plates. The documents also showed that Britain continued to press Amin for information on Bloch's whereabouts, and that Amin continually denied knowledge of her fate.

Recovery of body

Visual identification was impossible because her face was badly burned, but the corpse showed signs of a leg ulcer. A pathologist working with the Israel Defense Forces formally identified Bloch from the remains. Her remains were returned to her son in Israel, where she was given an Israeli state funeral. She was buried in Jerusalem's Har HaMenuchot Cemetery.

References

1970s missing person cases
1976 murders in Africa
Burials at Har HaMenuchot
Deaths by firearm in Uganda
Deaths by person in Africa
Female murder victims
Formerly missing people
Jewish martyrs
Missing person cases in Greece
Operation Entebbe
People from Jaffa
Uganda–United Kingdom relations
Violence against women in Uganda